The Warren Lasch Conservation Center is a building located at 1250 Supply Street at the former Charleston Navy Yard, in North Charleston, South Carolina. Part of the Clemson Restoration Institute, the center is most notably being used to excavate, examine, and preserve the submarine H. L. Hunley. In recent years, the center has expanded research into various metal and architectural conservation topics. The namesake of the building is Warren F. Lasch, who was chairman of Friends of the Hunley during the Hunley's recovery.

The Hunley is housed in a specially-designed tank of fresh water to await conservation.

External links
 Friends of the Hunley
Clemson Restoration Institute

Research institutes in South Carolina
Buildings and structures in North Charleston, South Carolina
Museums in Berkeley County, South Carolina